Scott Silver (born November 30, 1964) is an American screenwriter and film director.

Silver is best known for such films as Johns, The Mod Squad, 8 Mile, The Fighter, for which he was nominated for an Academy Award for Best Original Screenplay, and Joker, for which he was nominated for an Academy Award for Best Adapted Screenplay, alongside Todd Phillips. He is of Jewish descent. He is also set to co-write the script to the upcoming Spawn reboot.

Filmography

Producer
 Stronger (2017)

Co-executive producer
 The House of Yes (1997)

Special thanks
 Requiem for a Dream (2000)
 Then She Found Me (2007)
 Bleed for This (2016)
 Siberia (2018)

Awards and nominations

References

External links

American male screenwriters
Jewish American screenwriters
AFI Conservatory alumni
1964 births
Living people
Writers from Worcester, Massachusetts
Film directors from Massachusetts
Screenwriters from Massachusetts
21st-century American Jews